The Varanasi Police Commissionerate is the primary law enforcement agency for the city of Varanasi in the  Indian state of Uttar Pradesh. It is a unit of the Uttar Pradesh Police and has the primary responsibilities of law enforcement and investigation within the limits of Varanasi. It is headed by the Commissioner of Police (CP), who is an IPS officer of ADGP rank, and is assisted by two Additional Commissioners of Police (Addl. CP) who are of DIG rank, and two Deputy Commissioners of Police (DCP), who are of SP rank.

History 
Before March 2021, Varanasi District Police came under Varanasi Police Zone and Varanasi Police Range of Uttar Pradesh Police. Varanasi zone is headed by an IPS officer in the rank of Additional Director General of Police (ADG), whereas the Varanasi range is headed by an IPS officer in the rank of Inspector General of Police (IG).

Police Administration of Varanasi district was headed by the Senior Superintendent of Police (SSP) who was an IPS officer. He was assisted by four Superintendents of Police (SP)/Additional Superintendents of Police (Addl. SP) (City, Rural, Protocol, Traffic). The district was divided into eight police circles, each responsiwith the responsibilitiesrcle Officer (CO) in the rank of Deputy Superintendent of Police.

Structure 

The Varanasi Police Commissionerate is headed by a Police Commissioner who is of ADG rank and is assisted by two Additional Commissioner of Police (Addl. CP) of DIG rank.

There are total 18 of  stations that comes nder Varanasi Police Commissionerate.

Zones 

 Varuna Zone
 Cantt. Circle 
 Chetganj Circle
 Kashi Zone
 Bhelupur Circle
 Kotwali Circle
 Dashaswamedh Circle

Police Stations 
Under the police commissionerate system in Varanasi, the city's 18 police stations are divided into two zones, Kashi and Varuna. Five circles have been earmarked in both zones. 18 police stations come under the purview of these five circles.

Varuna Zone 
 Cantt. Circle
 Cantt.
 Shivpur
 Lalpur-Pandeypur
 Sarnath
 Paryatak

 Chetganj Circle
 Chetganj
 Jaitpura
 Sigra

Kashi Zone 
 Bhelupur Circle
 Bhelupur
 Lanka
 Manduwadih

 Kotwali Circle
 Kotwali
 Ramnagar
 Adampur
 Mahila

 Dashaswamedh Circle
 Dashaswamedh
 Chowk
 Luxa

Officers & Appointments

Commissioner of Police 

The present Commissioner of Varanasi Police is A. Satish Ganesh, IPS a 1996 batch officer of the Uttar Pradesh cadre, who took office on 25 March,

See also 

 Varanasi
 Uttar Pradesh Police
 Lucknow City Police

References 

Uttar Pradesh Police
Varanasi
Metropolitan law enforcement agencies of India
2021 establishments in Uttar Pradesh
Government agencies established in 2021